Sofiene Chaari (31 July 1962 – 22 August 2011) was a Tunisian actor who is famous for his role of Sbouï in the sitcom Choufli Hal (2005–2009).

Career 
He is the son of Habib Chaari, actor and cinema producer who helped him start his career in theater before turning to television. He first played in Mnamet Aaroussia, At Azaïez and The Hotel before becoming well-known as Sbouï in Choufli Hal, a Tunisian TV series aired from 2005 to 2009 during Ramadan. He played alongside Mouna Noureddine and Kamel Touati. After that, he remained famous with his role of Hsouna in Nsibti Laaziza aired on Nessma TV. He also presented his own TV-show  Sofiene Show which aired from 2009 to 2010. Alongside his TV career, he also played in theater in Saâdoun 28 and The Marechal. He earned a presidential prize in 2005 before he died in La Marsa, Tunisia, from a myocardial infarction at the age of 49.

Filmography
 1997 : El Khottab Al Bab 2 : Guest appearance
 1998 : Ichqa w Hkayet : Essebti
 2000 : Mnamet Aroussia : Flower seller
 2001 : Malla Ena
 2003 : Chez Azaïez :  Sadok
 2004 : L'hôtel : Stoukou
 2005-2009 : Choufli Hal : Sboui
 2010-2011 : Nsibti Laaziza : Hssouna

References

External links
 

Place of birth missing
1962 births
2011 deaths
Tunisian male film actors
Tunisian male television actors
21st-century Tunisian male actors